Nancy Carol Opel (born December 13, 1956) is an American singer and actress, known primarily for her work on Broadway. She was nominated for the 2002 Tony Award for Best Actress in a Musical for her role in the musical Urinetown.

Early life and education 
Opel grew up in the Kansas communities of Prairie Village and Leawood, and graduated from Shawnee Mission East High School. She trained at the Juilliard School.

Career
Opel was nominated for the 2002 Tony Award for Best Leading Actress in a Musical for her performance as Penelope Pennywise in Urinetown.

She has appeared on Broadway in Evita (1979), Teddy & Alice (1987), Sunday in the Park with George as Frieda, Betty (1984), Anything Goes (replacement Hope Harcourt), Triumph of Love (1997) as Corine Fiddler on the Roof (2004) as Yente, Memphis as Mama in 2011 and 2012 and Cinderella as Madame (the Stepmother) in June 2014 to September 7, 2014. She performed the roles of Mazeppa and Miss Cratchitt in the Encores! staged concert of Gypsy in 2007.

Opel portrayed Kafka in the Off-Broadway debut of David Ives' one-acter, Words, Words, Words, which ran at Primary Stages in November 1993 to February 1994 She appeared in another Ives play, Polish Joke, which ran Off-Broadway in a Manhattan Theatre Club production in February  to April 2003. Opel played several characters, and was nominated for the 2003 Drama Desk Award, Outstanding Featured Actress in a Play.

Opel played the title character in the first national tour of The Drowsy Chaperone, which started in September 2007.

In the 2008 rock musical The Toxic Avenger, she played three characters: the Mayor, Toxie's Mother, and a nun. The musical was performed at the George Street Playhouse in New Brunswick, New Jersey in October 2008. She appeared in the musical Off-Broadway at New World Stages, starting in April 2009. For this role, she received a 2009 Drama Desk Award nomination for Outstanding Featured Actress in a Musical.

From November 2014 to April 2015 she appeared on Broadway in the musical Honeymoon in Vegas, and was nominated for the 2015 Drama Desk Award for Outstanding Featured Actress in a Musical.

She played the title role in Hello, Dolly! at Ford's Theatre in 2013. She appeared in Follies at the Repertory Theatre of St. Louis in September to October 2016, as Carlotta. She appeared in the new musical Curvy Widow: The Musical at the North Carolina Stage Company  in October 2016.

It was announced on November 13, 2018, that Opel would be taking over the role of Madame Morrible in the Broadway production of Wicked, which she did on November 20. 

In 2021 Opel portrayed Carrie Chapman Catt in the historical musical The Suffragist, following the stories of Chapman Catt, along with Alice Paul, Ida B. Wells, Lucy Burns, and Anna Howard Shaw among others. The production was written by Cavan Hallman, with music by Nancy Hill Cobb, directed by Rachel Klein, and performed at the Gallagher Bluedorn Performing Arts Center. 

In 2022, Opel started portraying Cinderella's Stepmother in the Broadway revival of Into the Woods. She reprised this role in the subsequent 2023 national tour.

Opel's television credits include Law & Order, Law & Order: Criminal Intent, and Law & Order: SVU. She is also an acting coach.

Personal life
She resides with her daughter in Manhattan.

Filmography

Film

Television

References

External links
 
 

1956 births
Living people
Place of birth missing (living people)
American stage actresses
American television actresses
American women singers
Actresses from Kansas
Singers from Kansas
21st-century American women